DCAS may be:

 DCAS keys, control keys on the computer keyboard, see 
 Deputy Chief of the Air Staff (disambiguation)
 Derive computer algebra system
 Double compare-and-swap
 Downloadable Conditional Access System
 New York City Department of Citywide Administrative Services